Baten Bahini was an armed guerrilla force formed in Tangail district in support of independence during the Bangladesh Liberation War in 1971. It was named after its leader, Khandaker Abdul Baten. Throughout the war, it conducted a number of successful guerrilla campaigns in Tangail, Manikganj, Pabna, Gazipur, Sirajganj and some parts of Dhaka district. They were operated under 21 companies, 63 platoons and 100 sections. Abdul Baten led a number of guerrilla attacks.

See also
 Kader Bahini
 Mujib Bahini

References

Bangladesh Liberation War
Paramilitary forces of Bangladesh
Mukti Bahini